A device driver handling a virtual device.
 VxD, a type of Windows device driver running in 32-bit protected mode.